Ardkeen may refer to:

Ardkeen (civil parish), a civil parish in County Down, Northern Ireland
Ardkeen, County Waterford, a suburb of Waterford, Ireland